John Gresham Echols (January 9, 1916 – November 12, 1972) was a Major League Baseball player.

External links

1916 births
1972 deaths
Baseball players from Georgia (U.S. state)
St. Louis Cardinals players